Nahunta can refer to:

Nahunta, Georgia
Nahunta, North Carolina
USS Nahunta, a US Navy barge, named after the city in Georgia